The Mausoleum of Bangabandhu Sheikh Mujibur Rahman is the mausoleum of Sheikh Mujibur Rahman, the founder and the first president of the People's Republic of Bangladesh. It is located in Tungipara of Gopalganj district, the birthplace of Mujib, and was designed by architects Ehsan Khan, Ishtiaque Jahir and Iqbal Habib.

After Sheikh Mujibur Rahman was assassinated in 1975, he was buried in his native Tungipara. For many years the military junta restricted access to the grave site. After the Awami League was elected in the 1996 general election, the Department of Archaeology officially commenced construction of the complex, which was opened in 2001.

Background 
After the liberation of Bangladesh, Sheikh Mujibur Rahman became the 2nd prime minister of the country after being released from Mianwali Jail in Pakistan and returning to his motherland. He then started living in his own residence with family instead of moving to the government residence. He lived in his own house till August 15, 1975. On that day, some disgruntled army officers carried out the assassination of Sheikh Mujibur Rahman. His wife Sheikh Fazilatunnesa Mujib, his sons Sheikh Kamal, Sheikh Jamal, and Sheikh Russel were killed in the attack on their residence.

The next day, the military junta buried all but Mujib's body in the Banani graveyard. It was decided to bury Sheikh Mujibur Rahman at his birthplace, Tungipara, away from the country's capital. The Director General of Forces Intelligence assigned a major to hand over his body to his village relatives and supervise the burial. Major Haider Ali and 14 army personnel brought Mujib's dead body to Tungipara by helicopter. They found a distant relative of Mujib named Mosharraf Hussain whom they entrusted to bury Mujib. When a village imam was brought to perform the process, Ali asked him to bury the body without performing the funeral rites. Better than this, the imam said that if the dead person is a Shaheed, then he can be buried in this way. After listening to imam's answer, Major Ali asked to complete the funeral at low cost and quickly. Sheikh Mujibur Rahman was buried next to his father after completing the burial. Entry to his grave area was restricted for many years and no one was allowed to enter.

Construction 
In 1994, architect Ehsan Khan, Ishtiaq Zahir and Iqbal Habib were commissioned to convert Bangabandhu's residence in Dhaka into a museum. After they completed the work in 1995, Sheikh Hasina asked them to build a mausoleum complex for Sheikh Mujibur Rahman at Tungipara. A year later, after Awami League came to power, the government selected them to implement the mausoleum complex project. They were given two years to complete the project. The prime minister gave them the basic idea of what will be built under the master plan. The construction started in 1998. The foundation stone of the complex was laid on 17 March 1999 and inaugurated on 10 January 2001.

Layout 
The mausoleum complex is situated on 38.30 acres land and has a tomb building. There are graves of three people including Mujib and his parents. The tomb is surrounded by a dome. There is a library with 6000 books with a museum. There is an exhibition center which houses pictures of Sheikh Mujibur Rahman and some historical newspapers. There is an amusement park named after Sheikh Russel. Apart from this, there is Mujib's house and a Sheikh family mosque established in 1854. There is historical places related to the life of Mujib such as a pond, family garden etc. It has open stage, research center and so more. The complex has been designed in such a way that it fits into the village environment. Care was taken not to spoil the environment and nature of the area where the complex was built.

List of burials

In popular culture 
Syed Fakhruddin Mahmud wrote a poem about the mausoleum titled Ekti Omor Somadhi.

Gallery

References

External links

 Mausoleum of Bangabandhu 
 Mausoleum of Bangabandhu Sheikh Mujibur Rahman

Sheikh Mujibur Rahman
Sheikh Mujibur Rahman
Museums in Bangladesh
Tourist attractions in Bangladesh
Memorials to Sheikh Mujibur Rahman
Buildings and structures in Gopalganj District, Bangladesh
Buildings and structures completed in 2001